The 1976 United States presidential election in Missouri took place on November 2, 1976, as part of the 1976 United States presidential election. Voters chose 12 representatives, or electors, to the Electoral College, who voted for president and vice president.

Missouri was won by Jimmy Carter (D–Georgia), with 51.10% of the popular vote. Carter defeated incumbent President Gerald Ford (R–Michigan), who finished with 47.47% of the popular vote.

Jimmy Carter went on to become the 39th president of the United States. , this is the last election in which Laclede County, McDonald County, Bollinger County, Webster County, Pettis County, and Cass County voted for a Democratic Presidential candidate, and the last time a Democrat won Missouri with the majority of the vote.

Results

Results by county

See also
 United States presidential elections in Missouri

References

Missouri
1976
1976 Missouri elections